Fine Feathers is a 1915 British silent drama film directed by Maurice Elvey and starring Elisabeth Risdon, Fred Groves and Douglas Payne.

Plot
After a blind man recovers his sight his average-looking wife undergoes a makeover in order to make herself more attractive to him.

Cast
 Elisabeth Risdon - Meg Roberts 
 Fred Groves - Richard Dean 
 Douglas Payne - Dr. Beverley 
 Daisy Cordell - Mrs. Beverley 
 Kenelm Foss - Saxton 
 Dolly Tree

References

External links

1915 films
British silent feature films
1915 drama films
1910s English-language films
Films directed by Maurice Elvey
British drama films
British black-and-white films
1910s British films
Silent drama films